"Labelled with Love" is a song by Squeeze, released as the third single from the band's fourth album, East Side Story. It was the last Squeeze single to reach the top 10 on the UK Singles Chart, peaking at number 4 in 1981.

Difford and Tilbrook used the title in a 1983 musical.

Critical reception 
Bryan Wawzenek of Diffuser compiled a list of country songs by alternative, indie and punk artists. He proclaimed "Labelled with Love" to adorn both musical and lyrical "country hallmarks", with themes pertaining to "drinking and heartbreak" and instrumentation of "moseying beat and Nashville piano."

Track listing
 "Labelled with Love" (4:44)
 "Squabs on Forty Fab" (4:45)

Charts

References

External links
Squeeze discography at Squeezenet

Squeeze (band) songs
1981 singles
Songs written by Glenn Tilbrook
Songs written by Chris Difford
British country music songs
Country ballads
1980 songs
Song recordings produced by Elvis Costello